Cirrhochrista fuscusa is a moth in the family Crambidae. It was described by Fu-Qiang Chen, Shi-Mei Song and Chun-Sheng Wu in 2006. It is only found in Taiwan. This genus is extensively distributed in tropical and subtropical Africa, throughout tropical Asia to China, Japan, India, Madagascar and Australia.

References

Moths described in 2006
Spilomelinae
Moths of Taiwan